Antonín Melka (born 14 March 1990) is a Czech professional ice hockey player. He played with Rytíři Kladno in the Czech Extraliga (ELH) during the 2010–11 Czech Extraliga season.

References

External links

1990 births
Czech ice hockey forwards
Rytíři Kladno players
Living people
Sportspeople from Kladno
IHC Písek players
BK Havlíčkův Brod players
HC Berounští Medvědi players
Motor České Budějovice players